John L. Ray (born May 16, 1943) is a lawyer and Democratic politician in Washington, D.C.

Ray was an at-large member of the Council of the District of Columbia from 1979 to 1997. Ray is a partner and member of the board of directors at the law firm Manatt, Phelps & Phillips.

Early life
Raised in Tom Creek, Georgia, Ray graduated from George Washington University School of Law. While a law school student, Ray interned at Abe Fortas' law firm. After graduating from law school, Ray clerked for D.C. Circuit Judge Spottswood William Robinson III.

Political career
On January 8, 1979, Ray was appointed by the District of Columbia Democratic State Committee to the at-large council seat vacated by Marion Barry, who had been sworn in as mayor a few days earlier. He was Barry's chosen successor. Ray went on to win the May 1 special election handily and then to be reelected in 1980, 1984, 1988, and 1992.

Following Council Chairman John A. Wilson's suicide in May 1993, the council chose Ray to be acting chairman. Mayor Sharon Pratt Kelly had backed another at-large council member, Linda Cropp, for the appointment and thought she had lined up the votes on the council, but Charlene Drew Jarvis switched her vote to Ray because she intended to run for chairman in the special election and viewed Cropp as a threat. Ray served as acting chairman until the special election on September 14, which was won by former chairman David A. Clarke. Ray finished his term as at-large member, but he did not run for reelection in 1996.

Legal career
Ray worked for the United States Department of Justice from 1977 until 1978. By law, councilmembers other than the chairman are allowed to hold other employment. Ray was Of Counsel to the law firm Baker & Hostetler from 1988 to 1994. He joined Manatt, Phelps & Phillips in 1995 and has worked there since.

References

External links

1943 births
Living people
20th-century American lawyers
21st-century American lawyers
African-American people in Washington, D.C., politics
George Washington University Law School alumni
Members of the Council of the District of Columbia
People associated with BakerHostetler
People from Georgia (U.S. state)
Washington, D.C., Democrats